The 1883 South Australian Football Association season was the 7th season of the top-level Australian rules football competition in South Australia.

The Victorian Football Club renamed itself North Adelaide at the beginning of the season but has no connection to the modern day  Roosters.

Premiership season

Round 1

Round 2

Round 3

Round 4

Round 5

Round 6

Round 7

Round 8

Round 9

Round 10

Round 11

Round 12

Round 13

Round 14

Round 15

Round 16

Round 17

Round 18

Round 19

Round 20

Ladder 

Note: South Park were ranked above South Adelaide on head-to-head record (2-1).

References 

SANFL
South Australian National Football League seasons